The Long Beach Open was a golf tournament on the PGA Tour. It was held in Long Beach, California at the Virginia Country Club from 1926 to 1930 and at the Lakewood Country Club from 1949 to 1951.

In 1957 the Long Beach Open was a PGA Satellite Event. In 1989, a revived Long Beach Open came to the El Dorado and Recreation Park golf courses. Since 2006, Skylinks has been on pre-cut rotation, replacing Recreation Park.

Troy Grant at the age of 15 is the youngest ever to qualify and make the pro cut.

Winners
Long Beach Open (Long Beach Golf Festival)
2022 Michael Visacki
2020–21 No tournament
2019 Taylor Montgomery
2018 Jered Stone
2017 Bryan Martin
2016 Garrett Sapp
2015 Greg Bruckner
2014 Eric Meichtry
2013 Berry Henson
2012 Hyun Seok Lim
2011 Eric Meichtry
2010 Vincent Johnson
2009 Tyrone van Aswegen
2008 Ted Oh
2007 Todd Vernon
2006 Mike Cunning
2005 Peter Tomasulo
2004 Steve Schneiter
2003 David Oh
2002 Kevin Na
2001 Doug Garwood
2000 Todd Fischer
1999 Jeff Sanday
1998 Todd Fischer
1997 Bob Burns
1996 Dennis Paulson
1995 Jeff Bloom
1994 Scott McCarron
1993 Curtis Worley
1992 Scott Medlin
1991 Steve Jurgensen
1990 Paul Goydos
1989 John Mason
1958–1988 No tournament

Long Beach Open (Satellite Tour)
1957 Charlie Sifford
1952–1956 No tournament

Lakewood Park Open
1951 Cary Middlecoff

Long Beach Open
1950 Fred Haas
1949 Ben Hogan
1931–1948 No tournament
1930 Joe Kirkwood, Sr. and Olin Dutra (tie)
1928 (Dec.) Walter Hagen
1928 (Jan.) Leo Diegel and Bill Mehlhorn (tie)
1927 Tommy Armour
1926 Bill Mehlhorn

References

Former PGA Tour events
Golf in California
Sports in Long Beach, California
1926 establishments in California
Recurring sporting events established in 1926